Prince George's County Public Schools (PGCPS) is a large school district administered by the government of Prince George's County, Maryland, United States and is overseen by the Maryland State Department of Education. With approximately 127,129 students enrolled for the 2009–10 school year, the Prince George's County Public Schools system is the second largest school district in the state of Maryland; the third largest school district in both the Washington Metropolitan Area and Baltimore-Washington Metropolitan Area; and it's the 18th largest school district in the nation. 

PGCPS operates a total of 196 schools which includes 127 elementary schools, 36 middle schools, and 24 high schools with 8 special centers, 2 vocational centers, and the Howard B. Owens Science Center, serving students from Pre-Kindergarten through Grade 12

Public schools

High schools

Bladensburg High School
Bowie High School
Central High School
Crossland High School
Frederick Douglass High School
DuVal High School
Fairmont Heights High School
Charles Herbert Flowers High School
Friendly High School
Gwynn Park High School
High Point High School
Largo High School
Laurel High School
Northwestern High School
Oxon Hill High School
Parkdale High School
Potomac High School
Eleanor Roosevelt High School
Suitland High School
Surrattsville High School
Dr. Henry A. Wise, Jr. High School

Middle schools

Buck Lodge Middle School
Charles Carroll Middle School
CMTI North Middle School
Stephen Decatur Middle School and Community Center
Drew-Freeman Middle School
Dwight D. Eisenhower Middle School
Benjamin D. Foulois Creative and Performing Arts Academy
G. James Gholson Middle School
Robert Goddard French Immersion School
Robert Goddard Montessori School
Isaac J. Gourdine Middle School
Greenbelt Middle School
Gwynn Park Middle School
John Hanson French Immersion School
John Hanson Montessori School
Hyattsville Middle School
Thomas Johnson Middle School
Dr. Ernest Everett Just Middle School
Kenmoor Middle School
Kettering Middle School
Martin Luther King, Jr. Middle School
James Madison Middle School
Thurgood G. Marshall Middle School
Samuel Ogle Middle School
Nicholas Orem Middle School
Oxon Hill Middle School
Edgar Allan Poe Academy
Thomas G. Pullen Creative and Performing Arts Magnet School
Benjamin Stoddert Middle School
Benjamin Tasker Middle School
Walker Mill Middle School
William Wirt Middle School

Combined K-8 schools

The Accokeek Academy
Beltsville Academy
William W. Hall Academy
Andrew Jackson Academy
Samuel P. Massie Academy
 Imagine Leeland at Foundations Public Charter Schools

Elementary schools

Adelphi Elementary School
Allenwood Elementary School
Apple Grove Elementary School
Ardmore Elementary School
Arrowhead Elementary School
Avalon Elementary School
Baden Elementary School and Community Center
Barack Obama Elementary School (Opening August 2010)
Barnaby Manor Elementary School
John H. Bayne Elementary School
Beacon Heights Elementary School
William Beanes Elementary School and Community Center
Berwyn Heights Elementary School
Bladensburg Elementary School
Bond Mill Elementary School
Bradbury Heights Elementary School
Brandywine Elementary
Doswell E. Brooks Elementary School
Calverton Elementary School
Capitol Heights Elementary School
Carmody Hills Elementary School
Carole Highlands Elementary School
Carrollton Elementary School
Samuel Chase Elementary School
Cesar Chavez Elementary School
Cherokee Lane Elementary School
Chillum Elementary School
Thomas Claggett Elementary School
Clinton Grove Elementary School
Columbia Park Elementary School and Community Center
Concord Elementary School
Cool Spring Elementary School
Cooper Lane Elementary School
Deerfield Run Elementary School and Community Center
J. Frank Dent Elementary School
District Heights Elementary School
Dodge Park Elementary School
Francis T. Evans Elementary School
Flintstone Elementary School
Forest Heights Elementary School
Fort Foote Elementary School
Fort Washington Forest Elementary School
Benjamin D. Foulois Creative and Performing Arts Academy
Robert Frost Elementary School
Gaywood Elementary School
Glassmanor Elementary School and Community Center
Glenarden Woods Elementary School
Glenn Dale Elementary School
Glenridge Elementary School
Robert Goddard French Immersion School
Robert Goddard Montessori School
Robert R. Gray Elementary School
Greenbelt Elementary School
James H. Harrison Elementary School
Heather Hills Elementary School
High Bridge Elementary School
Highland Park Elementary School
Hillcrest Heights Elementary School
Hollywood Elementary School
Hyattsville Elementary School
Indian Queen Elementary School and Community Center
Mary Harris "Mother" Jones" Elementary School
Kenilworth Elementary School
Kenmoor Elementary School
Kettering Elementary School
Kingsford Elementary School
Lake Arbor Elementary School
Lamont Elementary School
Langley Park-McCormick Elementary School
Laurel Elementary School
Lewisdale Elementary School
Longfields Elementary School
Magnolia Elementary School
Marlton Elementary School
Mattaponi Elementary School
Melwood Elementary School
Montpelier Elementary School
Mount Rainier Elementary School
North Forestville Elementary School
Northview Elementary School
Oakcrest Elementary School
Oaklands Elementary School
Overlook Elementary School
Oxon Hill Elementary School
William Paca Elementary School
Paint Branch Elementary School
Panorama Elementary School
Rosa L. Parks Elementary School
Patuxent Elementary School
Perrywood Elementary School
Pointer Ridge Elementary School
Port Towns Elementary School
Potomac Landing Elementary School and Community Center
Princeton Elementary School
James Ryder Randall Elementary School
Catherine T. Reed Elementary School
Ridgecrest Elementary School
Riverdale Elementary School
Rockledge Elementary School
Rogers Heights Elementary School
Rosaryville Elementary School
Rose Valley Elementary School
Scotchtown Hills Elementary School
Seabrook Elementary School
Seat Pleasant Elementary School
Skyline Elementary School
Springhill Lake Elementary School
Suitland Elementary School
Tayac Elementary School
Templeton Elementary School
Tulip Grove Elementary School
University Park Elementary School
Valley View Elementary School
Vansville Elementary School and Community Center
Waldon Woods Elementary School
Whitehall Elementary School
Phyllis E. Williams Elementary School
Woodmore Elementary School
Woodridge Elementary School
Judge Sylvania W. Woods, Sr. Elementary School
Yorktown Elementary School

Magnet schools
Magnet schools provide a wide range of special or unique subjects, activities and/or learning opportunities, as an enhancement to the Prince George's County Public Schools comprehensive programs.

The Accokeek Academy
Berwyn Heights Elementary School
Capitol Heights Elementary School
Glenarden Woods Elementary School
Heather Hills Elementary School
Kenmoor Elementary School
Longfields Elementary School
Oakcrest Elementary School
Valley View Elementary School
Stephen Decatur Middle School and Community Center
Benjamin D. Foulois Creative and Performing Arts Academy
Dora Kennedy French Immersion School
Robert Goddard Montessori School
John Hanson French Immersion School
John Hanson Montessori School
Hyattsville Middle School
Kenmoor Middle School
Thomas G. Pullen Creative and Performing Arts Magnet School
Walker Mill Middle School
Bladensburg High School
Central High School
Crossland High School
Fairmont Heights High School
Charles Herbert Flowers High School
Largo High School
Laurel High School
Oxon Hill High School
Parkdale High School
Eleanor Roosevelt High School
Suitland High School
Dr. Henry A. Wise, Jr. High School

Private schools

Alternative High School
Ascension Lutheran School (K-8)
The Beddow School
Bishop McNamara High School
Capitol Christian Academy
Clinton Christian School
Croom Vocational School
DeMatha Catholic High School
Elizabeth Seton High School
Fairhaven School (Upper Marlboro, Maryland)
Florence Bertell Academy of Prince George's County
Grace Christian School
High Road Academy of Prince George's County
High Road Upper School of Prince George's County
Jericho Christian Academy
Lanham Christian School
Leary School
New Hope Academy
Queen Anne School
Riverdale Baptist School (K3-12)
St. Ann's High School
St. Ignatius Loyola School
St. Mary's School of Piscataway (K-8)
St. Vincent Pallotti High School
Tall Oaks Vocational School
The Maryland International Day School
Woodstream Christian Academy, Mitchelleville, Maryland

See also
Prince George's County Public Schools
List of Prince George's County Public Schools Middle Schools
Prince George's County Public Schools Magnet Programs

Prince George's County